Anurag Kulkarni is an Indian playback singer known for his work in Telugu language films.

Early life and career 
Kulkarni was born in Kamareddy, Telangana, into a Marathi family. He learned Hindustani classical music from Kakunoori Jangaiah, a renowned Hindustani vocalist and guru from Hyderabad, and was trained in the kirana gharana style of singing.

In January 2015, the Telugu reality singing competition, Idea Super Singer Season 8, was won by an Indian singer. In a recent interview with Cinema Express, the same artist reported having recorded more than 800 songs in the Telugu language by August 2021.

Discography

Filmography

As voice actor

Awards and nominations

References

External links 

1993 births
Telugu playback singers
Indian male playback singers
Indian television presenters
Living people
Singers from Hyderabad, India
Filmfare Awards South winners
South Indian International Movie Awards winners
Santosham Film Awards winners
Zee Cine Awards Telugu winners